is a 1968 Japanese-American animated fantasy film produced by Toei Doga, based on the works of Danish author Hans Christian Andersen. Theatrically released in Japan on March 19, 1968, the film was licensed in North America by United Artists in 1971.

Synopsis 
A young Hans Christian Andersen, while seeking an opera ticket, suddenly discovers the inspirations and talents he will later have for his fairy tales.

Release 
The World of Hans Christian Andersen was released by Toei on March 19, 1968, three years prior to Andersen Stories (Anderusen Monogatari, 1971), an eponymous and thematically similar series produced by Zuiyo Enterprise and Mushi Production. The film and the series also have in common composer Seiichirō Uno, screenwriters Hisashi Inoue and Morihisa Yamamoto, and voice actress Eiko Masuyama. The film was dubbed for U.S. audiences by Hal Roach, who hired Chuck McCann and Al Kilgore to assist him; this was one of his last efforts before his studio closed down.  In February 1971, United Artists announced its partnership with Hal Roach Studios to distribute this edit, which opened in theaters on March 1. Toei will continue to adapt Andersen's works in feature length movies such as: Hans Christian Andersen's The Little Mermaid (1975), The Wild Swans (1977) and Thumbelina (1978), and in the TV series World Fairy Tale Series.

Cast

Reception 
In his Family Guide to Movies on Video, Henry Herx wrote that "the animation is colorful and creative, though stylistically comparable to Saturday morning TV shows. It provides a wonderful world of fantasy to absorb the small fry at a matinee."  The writers of Jerry Beck's Animated Movie Guide gave it three stars out of four; as contributor Fred Patten commented, the film "is pleasant children's fare; a stereotypical and clichéd 'fun for the whole family' animated feature."

Home media 
The World of Hans Christian Andersen was first released to VHS by RCA/Columbia Pictures Home Video in the 1980s. In 2004, Digiview Productions released it on DVD

References

External links 
 
 

1968 films
1968 anime films
1960s fantasy films
United Artists animated films
1960s children's fantasy films
Films based on fairy tales
Films based on works by Hans Christian Andersen
Films based on The Little Match Girl
Toei Animation films
Toei Company films
Anime and manga based on fairy tales
Japanese animated fantasy films
United Artists films
1960s children's animated films
Films directed by Kimio Yabuki
1960s American films
1970s American films

ja:アンデルセン物語